The Affordable Weapon System is a US Navy program to design and produce a low cost "off the shelf" cruise missile launchable from a self-contained unit mounted in a standard shipping container.

Specifications
 Length: (w/o booster): 3.32 m (10 ft 11 in) 
 Diameter: 34.3 cm (13.5 in)
 Weight: 394 kg (737 lb)
 Speed: 400 km/h (250 mph)
 Ceiling: 4570 m (15000 ft)
 Range: > 1560 km (840 nm)
 Propulsion: Solid rocket booster and SWB Turbines SWB-65 turbojet sustainer.
 Payload: 200 lbs.
 Guidance: GPS and in-flight datalink.

Program status
 April 2002 - International Systems LLC of San Diego, Calif. (subsidiary of Titan Corp.) awarded a $25,657,312 cost-plus-fixed-fee contract for continuing development and implementation.
 June 2005 - Titan awarded a $32.4 million contract modification to produce approximately 85 missiles for demonstration, test and evaluation. The contract also includes work for the AWS launcher design and ship integration.
 September 2005 - Titan awards contract for launch systems to BAE Systems.
 July 2008 - DOD Research, Development, Test, and Evaluation budget earmarks $15,200,000 for program.

References

External links
 SWB Turbines SWB-65
 Titan shoots for bargain missile - San Diego Union-Tribune

Cruise missiles of the United States
Area denial weapons
Naval weapons
Proposed weapons of the United States
Equipment of the United States Navy